Phillip Sandifer (born 10 May, 1959) is an American writer, musician, recording artist and music producer. His music is primarily known within the Americana and Inspirational music field.

Personal life
Phillip Sandifer was born in Baltimore, Maryland on 10 May 1959 but moved to Dallas, Texas as a youth.  He attended Highland Park High School, Auburn University (Auburn, Alabama) and the University of Texas at Austin where he received a degree in History. He holds master's degrees from Clemson University (Clemson, South Carolina) and Gordon-Conwell Theological Seminary (South Hamilton, MA), a Doctor of Ministry degree from Covenant Theological Seminary (St. Louis, MO), and a PhD from The University of Southern Mississippi. He has been married to Rene Burchard Sandifer since 1984. They have four grown children.

Music career
Sandifer began his music career in 1981, when he created an album on a minimal budget. He has authored and performed 22 top 40 Adult Contemporary songs and six #1 inspirational songs (as noted in CCM Magazine and The Christian Research Report) in the Inspirational Music field. Sandifer acknowledges that while financial gain may elude those choosing the route of the independent label there is a great deal of satisfaction in creating largely on one's own terms. While not as visible as many artists, maintaining artistic control over his music has allowed for a career described as "constant" and music described as "consistent".  Early advice from his godfather, Dallas lawyer Shannon Jones who helped bring the Buddy Holly bill (which protects the persona, likeness, and creative works of artists) into being has guided many of Sandifer's career decisions.  His releases have been distributed on Urgent Records (Austin, TX) through Sparrow Records (now known as EMI Christian Music) followed by Benson Music Group (now known as Provident-Integrity Distribution) and Wider Sky through The Orchard (Sony Music Entertainment).

Sandifer has recorded with such artists as Jennifer Warnes, Wendi Foy (Sierra), Billy Crockett, Bob Bennett and Michele Wagner and written music for Glen Campbell, Fernando Ortega, Bob Bennett, Kim Hill, Cheri Keaggy, Rob Frazier, Dawn Smith Jordan (Miss South Carolina), Gary Powell and others.  He has participated on recordings distributed by EMI, Disney, BMG Music and Warner Music Group although most of his solo recordings have been released on Urgent Records (Austin, TX), an independent label founded by Sandifer in 1984, Selfless Music and more recently Wider Sky Music.

Current
In 1998 Sandifer participated in Disney Records "A Bugs Life Sing Along" which was nominated for a Grammy Award in 1999.  In 1999 he withdrew from the music industry in order to focus on expanding Christian radio's reach in the Austin, Texas metro area. In 2000 he joined a local church staff in order to participate in furthering the involvement of the contemporary arts in church settings.  In 2004 he participated as a guest vocalist on his second Disney Recording – "Luv-A-Byes", recording the Kenny Loggins classic (and one of Phillip's favorites) "Return To Pooh Corner".

Between 1999 and 2005 Sandifer participated in launching four new radio stations broadcasting largely Christian music programming in the Austin, TX area. In addition, he launched a local community radio station (KDRP-LP, aka K-Drip) to serve his local community of Dripping Springs, TX. KDRP played an eclectic mix of music including Texana flavored music and involved many local personalities. KDRP evolved into the Sun Radio network in the hands of Sandifer's successor owners. 

In 2010–11 he renewed his writing and recording career releasing two new solo projects "Prone To Calamity" and "Expressions: Songs Of Worship" (an album of worship songs).  Of "Prone To Calamity" Cross Rhythm's Phil Thomson noted "This has to be one of the best self-produced albums I have come across in many a year". In January 2012 Sandifer released "Simple Hymns". Of "Simple Hymns" Cross Rhythm's Tony Cummings noted Phillip's "warm, Dan Fogelberg-sounding voice and beautifully picked guitar". Cummings further regarded Sandifer's renditions of "Be Thou My Vision", "Blessed Assurance" and "Great Is Thy Faithfulness" as showing "the veteran to be one of the most underrated song interpreters around". "Recently Played" was released in 2016 followed up with "Go On" which The Roots Music Report heralded as one of the top 200 Americana projects released in 2018. In August of 2019 Phillip founded The School Arts Initiative Charitable Foundation, a foundation dedicated to aiding public school district fine arts programs obtain supplemental funding.  In the spring of 2020 Sandifer released a music video "Someone Else" to call attention to the shortage of personal protective equipment during the Covid-19 pandemic. In the summer and fall of 2020 Sandifer released the music videos "Weep For Angry Christians", "If This Were A Flood" and "Turn This Ship Around" dealing with the pandemic and the political turmoil of 2020.

In October of 2020 Phillip's song "Turn This Ship Around" was included on the album "Hope Rises", a compilation project produced by Noel Paul Stookey (Peter, Paul and Mary) and Neale Eckstein.  Phillip also released a new 10 song album worldwide in January of 2021 entitled "Shoo The Cat Away" which includes songs written throughout the early days of the pandemic and referencing the turbulent political and spiritual upheaval of 2020.

Discography (artist) 
Never Steal The Show (1981) Urgent Records
On My Way (1984) Urgent Records
Keeping The Dream Alive (1986) Urgent Records
Constant (1988) Urgent Records
Christmas in Our Time with Bob Bennett, Billy Crockett, Wendy Foy (1989) Urgent Records
Phillip Sandifer (1989) Urgent Records
The Other Side of Salvation (1991) Urgent Records
Arizona Highway (1994) Urgent Records
Passages:The Fruits Of The Spirit (1994) Benson Music Group
Moon Circles – Santa Fe (1997) Urgent Records
A Bug's Life Sing-Along (1998) Disney Records
Sensible Enigmas (1999) Urgent Records
The Best Of Phillip Sandifer I (2001) Urgent Records
The Best Of Phillip Sandifer II (2004) Urgent Records
Luv-a-Byes (2006) Disney Records
Prone To Calamity (2011) Wider Sky/The Orchard/Sony Music Entertainment
Simple Hymns (2012) Wider Sky/The Orchard/Sony Music Entertainment
Of Songs and Sacraments (2014) Wider Sky/The Orchard/Sony Music Entertainment
Recently Played (2015) Wider Sky/The Orchard/Sony Music Entertainment
Go On (2018) Wider Sky/The Orchard/Sony Music Entertainment
Hope Rises (2020) Music To Life
Shoo The Cat Away (2020) Wider Sky/The Orchard/Sony Music Entertainment

Discography (producer) 
Keeping The Dream Alive (Phillip Sandifer) (1986) Urgent Records
The Urgency Of Praise (Various Artists) (1991) Urgent Records
Windows & Doors (Catherine King) (1991) Urgent Records
In A Welcome Field (Fernando Ortega) – Executive Producer* (1992) Urgent Records
The Urgency Of Praise II (Various Artists) (1993) Urgent Records
How Far (Dawn Smith Jordan) (1993) Heart & Soul Music
Arizona Highway (Phillip Sandifer) (1994) Urgent Records
Canopy (Dawn Smith Jordan) (1995) Heart & Soul Music
Unchained Heart (Linda Richards) (1996) Heart & Soul Music
Songs For The Heart & Soul (Various Artists) (1995) Heart & Soul Music
A Moment Alone (Dawn Smith Jordan) (1998) Heart & Soul Music
Sensible Enigmas (Phillip Sandifer) (1999) Urgent Records
Everyday Praise (Dawn Smith Jordan) (2001) Heart & Soul Music
Addison (Addison Hayes) (2002)
This Far (Dawn Smith Jordan) (2011) Wider Sky/The Orchard/Sony Music Entertainment
Prone To Calamity (Phillip Sandifer) (2011) Wider Sky/The Orchard/Sony Music Entertainment
Simple Hymns (Phillip Sandifer) (2012) Wider Sky/The Orchard/Sony Music Entertainment
Chasing Grace EP (Chasing Grace) (2012) Independent
Timeless Hymns (Dawn Smith Jordan) (2012) Wider Sky/The Orchard/Sony Music Entertainment
It's Cool To Build A School (Various Artists) (2013) Wider Sky/The Orchard/Sony Music Entertainment
Of Songs and Sacraments (Phillip Sandifer) (2014) Wider Sky/The Orchard/Sony Music Entertainment
Recently Played (Phillip Sandifer) (2015) Wider Sky/The Orchard/Sony Music Entertainment
Go On (Phillip Sandifer) (2018) Wider Sky/The Orchard/Sony Music Entertainment
Timeless Hymns, Volume II (Dawn Smith Jordan) (2019) Wider Sky/The Orchard/Sony Music Entertainment
Shoo The Cat Away (Phillip Sandifer) (2020) Wider Sky/The Orchard/Sony Music Entertainment

References

External links
 Official site
 Urgent Records / Wider Sky Music

Living people
1959 births
American male musicians
Auburn University alumni
University of Texas at Austin College of Liberal Arts alumni
American male writers